9th Regiment may refer to:

Great Britain
 9th Regiment of Foot

United States
 9th Marine Regiment (United States)
 9th Infantry Regiment (United States)

France
 9th Parachute Chasseur Regiment

Italy
 9th Parachute Assault Regiment

Ukraine
 9th Greek Regiment